Theodore Francis Edward Duffie (April 3, 1917 – 1977) was a Canadian politician. He served in the Legislative Assembly of New Brunswick from 1960 to 1963 as member of the Liberal party.

References

1917 births
1977 deaths
New Brunswick Liberal Association MLAs